Stony Mountain Ski Area is a ski area in the Rural Municipality of Rockwood, just northeast of Stony Mountain, Manitoba, Canada and is  north of the Perimeter Highway.

The ski hill has two lifts - one handle tow and one rope tow. The hill has a  vertical drop.

References
Stony Mountain Ski Area

Ski areas and resorts in Manitoba